Laura is the second studio album by Italian singer Laura Pausini, released by CGD Records in 1994. It has sold three million copies in the world.

Track info 
The release of the album coincides with the participation of Laura Pausini in the Sanremo Festival 1994, where the singer made her debut in the category Giovani after winning the previous year as the Nuove proposte.

At the stage, Pausini, a big favourite of the spectators, ranked third in the final ranking.

The piece presented, Strani amori, was attacked by critics because it was judged too conservative and adolescent and some journalists in the industry saw it as a trivial piece.

Within the disc is also included the second single extracted from the album, Gente. Some tracks from the album were translated into Spanish and inserted on the version released in Spain and South America for the album Laura Pausini, released in 1994. The same tracks were released in Italian on the English version of the same album, released in 1995.

The song Ragazze che, much like the entire album, is dedicated to Silvia Pausini, sister of the singer.

Promotion 
Since Pausini was not known outside Europe at the time the album was released, no tour was yielded to support the album. Although, Pausini's tours that date from after the World Wide Tour 1997 have at least one song from the album. These songs are Strani amori, Gente, Un amico è così, Il coraggio che non c'è, Ragazze che, Lui non sta con te and Lettera, with the first two being sung on every of Pausini's tours.

Track listing

Charts

Weekly charts

Year-end charts

Certifications

References 

1994 albums
Laura Pausini albums
Italian-language albums
Compagnia Generale del Disco albums